The Army Personnel Office (Heeres Personal Amt, Heerespersonalamt or Heeres Personalamt) was a German military agency formed in 1920 and charged with the personnel matters of all officers and cadets of the army of the Reichswehr and later the Wehrmacht. With increased recruitment of officers in 1935 and especially in the Second World War, it was given multiple new tasks. The growing demands led to numerous organisational changes.

In October 1942 Major General Rudolf Schmundt became the new head of the HPA. After his death from injuries received during the assassination attempt on Hitler's life of 20 July 1944 General Wilhelm Burgdorf took over the function.

The agency had several departments (Abteilung).

 Abteilung P 1: Planning human resources, personnel management of the officers
 Abteilung P 2: Disciplinary matters of the officers
 Abteilung P 3: Staffing of the General Staff officers; transferred to the central department of the General Staff of the Army in 1935
 Abteilung P 4: Personnel management of the officers of the special careers; was renamed P 3 on 1 April 1939
 Abteilung P 5: Order, decorations and awards department

Chiefs of the Heerespersonalamt

See also
Chief of the Luftwaffe Personnel Office (Luftwaffe equivalent)

References

Citations

Bibliography 

 

Reichswehr
Wehrmacht